Sanino is a rural locality (a village) in Nagornoye Rural Settlement, Petushinsky District, Vladimir Oblast, Russia. The population was 155 as of 2010. There are 11 streets.

Geography 
Sanino is located 44 km northwest of Petushki (the district's administrative centre) by road. Saninskogo DOKa is the nearest rural locality.

References 

Rural localities in Petushinsky District